Rachel Romer is the co-founder and CEO of Guild Education.

Early life and education
Rachel Romer is the daughter of former Colorado State Senator and charter school investor Chris Romer, and a granddaughter of former Colorado Governor Roy Romer. Governor Romer was instrumental in the formation and growth of Western Governors University.  As a child, she sometimes attended and participated in her grandfather's campaign, and in 2011 worked as the finance director for her father's unsuccessful mayoral campaign  . 

She  completed an undergraduate degree, and also an MBA and an MA in Education at Stanford University. While at Stanford, she took a break to work for the Obama administration, l. She also worked with her father on issues related to access to higher education.

Career
After graduation, Romer worked for American Honors, an organization co-founded by her father that coaches community college students, and The Parthenon Group,  Ernst & Young's global strategy consulting arm, as well as the Obama campaign and the Office of Presidential Personnel in the Obama administration. She  was the chief executive of Student Blueprint, an app she created while at Stanford during her MBA program to help community college students find jobs.

In 2015, at the age of 27, Romer co-founded Guild Education with her former classmate Brittany Stich, after she conducted research for two years with Stich into low graduation rates,   In 2019, the organization became valued at over $1 billion. In 2020, it was listed as a CNBC Top 50 disruptor.

In March 2020, Romer co-authored an open letter, signed by more than 450 other CEOs and investors, advocating for business leaders to mitigate the COVID-19 pandemic. She is a co-founder and strategic advisor for the organization Stop The Spread.

In June 2021 Guild Education was valued at $3.7 billion. Carlson's personal wealth was estimated to be $570 million in 2022.

Honors and awards
 (2017) Romer and co-founder Brittany Stich were listed on the Forbes 30 under 30 list.
 (2020) Entrepreneur of the Year, EY Entrepreneur of the Year Awards - Mountain Desert region.
(2021) Forbes list of self-made women.

Personal life
In 2014, Rachel Romer married David Carlson.She has 2 daughters.

See also
Employee education benefits in the United States

For-profit higher education in the United States

References

Living people
American chief executives of education-related organizations
21st-century American businesspeople
21st-century American businesswomen
Stanford University alumni
1988 births